School of Electrical Engineering and Computer Science may refer to:
 School of Electrical Engineering and Computer Science (University of Ottawa), Canada
 NUST School of Electrical Engineering and Computer Science of the National University of Sciences and Technology, Pakistan